Cibin is a river in central Romania, in the south part of Transylvania. Its source is close to the highest peak in the Cindrel Mountains (known also as Cibin Mountains) of the Southern Carpathian Mountains. Upstream from its confluence with the Râul Mic, the river is also called Râul Mare. The river flows entirely in Sibiu County.

It is an important tributary of the river Olt, flowing into this close to Tălmaciu, in the immediate vicinity of the Podu Olt railway station.

The river forms the depression (Sibiu Depression) in which lies the city of Sibiu, through which it flows. Close to the mountains, the river flows through the Mărginimea Sibiului area, known for its strong Romanian traditions. Two of the biggest communes of Sibiu County – Gura Râului and Orlat – are situated on the river banks.

The economical importance or the river comes from the dam close to Gura Râului, which, besides generating electrical power, represents the biggest source of drinking water for the city of Sibiu. Also a few construction aggregate quarries stations are situated on the river.

Tributaries
The following rivers are tributaries to the river Cibin (from source to mouth):

Left: Râul Mic, Breaza, Săliște (near Orlat), Rusciori, Fărmăndola, Hârtibaciu (near Veștem)

Right: Niculești, Măciuca, Crăciuneasa, Izvorul de la Degnaza, Păltiniș, Valea Cărbunarului, Valea Mare, Mărăjdia Veche, Valea Lupului, Valea Aurie, Valea Săpunului, Sebeș, Cisnădie, Valea Tocilelor, Valea Sărății, Sadu (near Tălmaciu), Lungșoara

Gallery

References

 
Rivers of Romania
Rivers of Sibiu County